The red-winged pytilia (Pytilia phoenicoptera) is a common species of estrildid finch found in Africa. It has an estimated global extent of occurrence of 370,000 km2.

It is found at Benin, Burkina Faso, Cameroon, Central African Republic, Chad, The Democratic Republic of the Congo, Côte d'Ivoire, Ethiopia, Gambia, Ghana, Guinea, Guinea-Bissau, Mali, Niger, Nigeria, Senegal, Sierra Leone, Sudan, Togo and Uganda. The IUCN has classified the species as being of least concern.

The red-billed pytilia (Pytilia lineata) was recently split from this species.

References

External links
BirdLife International species factsheet
Red-winged Pytilia (Aurora Finch) Species Profile

red-winged pytilia
Birds of Sub-Saharan Africa
red-winged pytilia